Lawrence Long Daniels  (July 14, 1862 – January 7, 1929), was a Major League Baseball player who played catcher and outfielder. He played for the Baltimore Orioles and Kansas City Cowboys of the American Association from 1887–1888.

External links

1862 births
1929 deaths
Major League Baseball catchers
Major League Baseball outfielders
Baltimore Orioles (AA) players
Kansas City Cowboys players
19th-century baseball players
Quincy Quincys players
Omaha Omahogs players
Keokuk Hawkeyes players
Worcester Grays players
Wheeling Nailers (baseball) players
Baseball players from Massachusetts